Étienne Parent (May 2, 1802 in Beauport, Lower Canada – December 22, 1874 in Ottawa) was a Canadian journalist and government official.

He was editor of the newspaper Le Canadien and, as such, supported French Canadian journalism and writing. He was a close friend and supporter of Lord Gosford.

From 1825 to 1829 he studied law as a student in the office of Joseph-Rémi Vallières de Saint-Réal, and later in that of Charles-Eusèbe Casgrain. For his eventual attacks on the government, he was briefly imprisoned, even though he did not actively join the Rebellion of 1837. After the union of Lower Canada and Upper Canada into the Province of Canada in 1841, he was elected to the Legislative Assembly of the Province of Canada for Saguenay. He resigned his seat a year later on appointment as Clerk of the Executive Council.

Notes

References
 Sebastien Tessier. "Parent, Étienne (1802-1874)", in Les Patriotes de 1837@1838, May 19, 2001
 Réginald Hamel, John Hare and Paul Wyczynski. "Parent, Étienne", in Dictionnaire des auteurs de langue française en Amérique du Nord, Éditions Fides, 1989 (online via BAnQ)

External links 
 Étienne Parent (1802-1874), Textes choisis et présentés par Paul-Eugène Gosselin (PDF, RTF, Word) digitized by Marcelle Bergeron for Les Classiques des sciences sociales
Historica’s Heritage Minute video docudrama about “Étienne Parent.” (Adobe Flash Player.)

1802 births
1874 deaths
Journalists from Quebec
Persons of National Historic Significance (Canada)
19th-century Canadian journalists
Canadian male journalists
19th-century Canadian male writers
Members of the Legislative Assembly of the Province of Canada from Canada East